The Donji Vir is one of the smallest mountain lakes in the Šar Mountains of Kosovo. It is situated just a few meters west of the larger Small Jazhincë Lake.

See also 
 Small Jažinačko Lake

Notes

References 

Šar Mountains
Lakes of Kosovo
Lakes of Serbia